Bill Wray (born Shreveport, Louisiana) is an American musician, composer and producer. His performing career spanned the mid 1970s through the early 1980s. Since then he has written and produced a variety of artists from glam metal to cajun. He is the brother of fellow musician/composer Jim Wray.

Music career
Bill Wray made an appearance on the Billboard Hot 100 with the song "Pinball, That's All" in 1979, peaking at No. 96.

Bill Wray has written the songs "Fool for Your Love" and "So Close" for Diana Ross. Wray and his brother Jim wrote most of the hits ("One in a Million", "Surrender") on Trixter's debut album.

Wray was the producer of EFX at MGM Grand Casino, at the time the most expensive and largest-scaled theater installation in the world.  Stars rotated through every two years were Michael Crawford, David Cassidy, Tommy Tune and Rick Springfield.  The last three were during Wray's tenure.

Bill Wray used to play at the old Dynasty Club and Common Ground in Baton Rouge, Louisiana. There was also the Bill Wray Band which included Greg Worley. As an artist, Wray opened for such artists as Foreigner, Toto, Rick Springfield, The Kinks, BTO, Peter Frampton and Joe Cocker.

Wray produced Driven2Rock at the MGM Grand which gave custom inlaid Melancon Guitars to stars such as Dale Earnhardt Jr., Britney Spears and Michael Waltrip on March 5 and 6th 2004.

Credits

Composed songs for
 Lisa Hartman
 Little Feat
 God Street Wine
 EFX (show)
 Flame
 Diana Ross
 Loverboy
 Zachary Richard
 Trixter
 Emerson, Lake & Palmer
 Ace Frehley - Courtesy AMG

Songs composed by (officially credited)
 Song - Artist
 'Till My Heart Stops Beating - Lisa Hartman
 Angeline - God Street Wine
 Apotheosis (Final Dance) - 1999 Las Vegas Cast EFX
 Back to the Future - Diana Ross
 Better Day - Eric Martin
 Big Bang Theory - Little Feat
 Borderline Blues - Little Feat
 Bullet in the Chamber - Loverboy
 Burning - Zachary Richard
 Cadillac Hotel - Little Feat
 Cajun Rage - Little Feat
 Change - Emerson, Lake & Palmer
 Dancing at Double d's - Zachary Richard
 Destination Heartbreak - Loverboy
 Down in Congo Square - Zachary Richard
 Drivin' Blind - Little Feat
 Eclipse - 1999 Las Vegas Cast EFX 
 EFX (Bring On The Dream) - 1999 Las Vegas Cast EFX 
 Friday Night - Loverboy
 Gone Too Soon - Emerson, Lake & Palmer
 Heart of Steel - Trixter
 How Many Rivers? - Lisa Hartman
 In Dreams - 1999 Las Vegas Cast EFX
 Intergalactic Circus of Wonders - 1996 and 1999 Las Vegas Cast EFX
 It's A Wonderful Life - Diana Ross
 Lead a Double Life - Loverboy
 Let it Shine, Pts 1 & 2 - 1996 & 1999 Las Vegas Cast EFX
 No Mercy - 1990 Lionheart soundtrack 
 One in a Million - Trixter
 Only Young Once - Trixter
 Play Rough - Trixter
 Prologue - 1999 Las Vegas Cast EFX
 Ride the Whip - 1999 Las Vegas Cast EFX 
 Rock & Roll Everynight - Little Feat
 Roll Me - Zachary Richard
 Shockwaves - Diana Ross
 So Close - Diana Ross
 Song and Dance Man - 1999 Las Vegas Cast EFX
 Steal the Thunder - Loverboy
 Surrender - Trixter
 Tempt Me (If You Want To) - Navy SEALs Soundtrack / Lisa Hartman
 Tender Kiss - Lisa Hartman
 The Curtain Call - 1999 Las Vegas Cast EFX
 The Wedge - 1999 Las Vegas Cast EFX
 Thin Line - Emerson, Lake & Palmer
 This Could Be the Night - Loverboy
 Too Much Too Soon - Loverboy
 Trouble Walkin' - Ace Frehley
 What a Night - 1999 Las Vegas Cast EFX
 What She Don't Know - 1991 Flame
 When You Believe (Lullaby) - 1999 Las Vegas Cast EFX 
 When You Dream - Diana Ross
 Where Did We Go Wrong - Diana Ross
 You'll Never See My Cryin' - Trixter
 Zydeco Jump - Zachary Richard

Own albums
 Bill Wray (1976 MCA/legend 2188 Leon Medica performs on album)ASIN: B000RZQKM0
 Seize the Moment (1983 Liberty LT-51140 Produced by John Ryan for Chicago Kid Productions)
 Bill Wray and His Show Band Royale (songs Ooo Baby, Baby and Morning Dew, Warner Brothers-Seven Arts #7317, other artists: Jim Chiek)
 Fire and Ice (1981 Liberty LT-1098)
 Louisiana Rain (Liberty)
 Takin My Time (MCA 40611)
 Pinball, That's All - Tilt (film) soundtrack. Made Billboard top 100 (hit 96 for two weeks starting 5/19/1979 ABC 12449) Other songs for film: My Music, Where Were You, Don't Stop the Music, Rock and Roll Rodeo, Melody Man, Friends, Mercedes Morning, Koala Shuffle.
 Unknown Album 1979 - Don't Stop the Music, Friends, Long Road to Texas, Melody Man, My Music, Pinball That's All, Rock N Roll Rodeo, Where Were You
 Goin' Down/(You're A) Heartbreaker (1983 Liberty 1491 or SP225) - single
 River City (1976 7" single MCA 40576
 Takin' My Time/Same (1976 single MCA 40611)
 Louisiana Rain (???? Liberty 1428) - single

Other credits
 Year - Album - Artist - Credit
 1979 - Tilt (film) IMDB - Original Soundtrack - Vocals, Composition, Music Arranger, pinball machine music [ AMG] ABC 1114
 1983 - Private School (aka Private School for Girls) - Bandleader - actor and performer on soundtrack East World (WPT-90)
 1983 - Break Out - The Pointer Sisters - uncredited project work with producer Richard Perry
 1984 - 1100 Bel Air Place - Julio Iglesias - uncredited project work with producer Richard Perry
 1985 - Private Resort - Original Soundtrack - composer "Ba Ba Ben", "Caribbean Heat", "Postcards", "Summer Eve" 
 1990 - Navy Seals - Original Soundtrack - Producer
 1990 - Trixter - Trixter - Producer
 1990 - Lionheart (film) - Original Soundtrack - "No Mercy" performer 
 1991 - Don't Tell Mom The Babysitter's Dead
 1992 - Snake Bite Love - Zachary Richard - Background vocals
 1994 - In the Hot Seat - Emerson, Lake & Palmer - Background vocals
 1995 - Ain't Had Enough Fun - Little Feat - Producer
 1996 - Live From Neon Park - Little Feat - Producer
 1996 - Pompatus of Love - Original Soundtrack - Producer
 1997 - From The Beginning: Retrospective - Greg Lake - Background vocals
 1997 - God Street Wine - God Street Wine - Arranger, Sound Effects, Producer, Mixing
 1998 - Rock and Roll Doctor: Lowell George Tribute - Various Artists - Producer
 1998 - Somewhere in the Middle - Eric Martin (singer) - Producer, Mixing
 1999 - Arrhythmia - Jack Mack and the Heart Attack - Producer
 2000 - Hotcakes and Outtakes: 30 Years of Little Feat - Little Feat - Producer, Assistant Engineer, Production Consultant
 2000 - Silver Jubilee: Best of Zachary Richard 1973-1998 - Zachary Richard - Producer
 2002 - Sidekick - Everyone's Hero - Producer
 2004 - Destroy All Monsters - Eric Martin (singer) - Producer
 2006 - Best of Little Feat - Little Feat - Producer, Original Recording Producer

References

External links
 
 1983 Interview

Year of birth missing (living people)
Living people
American composers
American male composers
American male singers
Record producers from Louisiana
Musicians from Shreveport, Louisiana
Singers from Louisiana